Way Productions is a group of musicians affiliated with The Way International. The lyrics to their songs are based on the Bible and practical application of it. They perform every Sunday afternoon at The Way's headquarters in New Knoxville, Ohio, for the Way's Sunday teaching services. They also perform at special events put on at various times throughout the year.

Musical styles
 Gospel
 Rock and Roll
 Rock
 Soul
 Country/Western
 Jazz
 Blues
 Funk
 Classic R&B and modern R&B
 Dance oriented music
 Salsa
 Disco

Musical Groups

Official
 Singing Ladies of the Way
 The Present Truth

Unofficial or former
 Fellow Workers With God
 High Country Trio 
 Hope 
 Joyful Noise 
 Pressed Down, Shaken Together and Running Over 
 Sing it Dave 
 Selah (from the 1970s)
 The Victors 
 Agape (UK)
 Takit
 Acts 29
 CORE
 Ted Ferrell
 Age of Grace
 Branded
 Jordan River Ramblers
 New Horizons
 Breakthrough
 Lakeview Telecasters
 Good Seed
 Bob Stanley

Music titles

Some CD albums
The Prevailing Word in Music (1998)
Jesus Christ: The Way, The Truth, The Life (2001)
Moving Ahead (2003)
Valiant for the Truth: The Present Truth (2004)
Walking with the Father (2005)
Living in the Light of the Word (2006)
Power and Light (2011)
For the Glory of God (2012) 
Let Your Light Shine (2013) NEW!

Some songs
The Promised Land of the Prevailing Word (Rock, 1998)
The Present Truth (Blues, 1998, 2004)
Biblical Solutions (Soul, 2006)
There's A Harvest There (Jazz, 2006)
Our Power for Abundant Living (Funk, 2008)
Living Today for the Hope (Disco, 2012)

External links
The Way International YouTube Channel- The Way International YouTube Channel
The Way Multimedia Page- Way Productions videos are presented here.
 
 
Joe Fair @ IAC:
 http://iacmusic.com/Artist.aspx?ID=61900

CORE
 http://www.iacmusic.com/artist.aspx?ID=65788

The Way International
American Christian musical groups